Martin Slanar (born 1 May 1981) is an Austrian male tennis player.

Professional career

2007
Slanar's career got going in 2007.  His career-best singles ranking is world No. 198, achieved in May 2008.

External links 
 
 
 Slanar World Ranking History

Austrian male tennis players
1981 births
Living people
21st-century Austrian people